Wivels Forlag was a publishing house operated by Ole Wivel  from 1945-54 in Copenhagen, Denmark. It published the literary magazine Heretica.

History
Ole Wivel established Wivels Forlag and experienced his literary breakthrough as a poet with his own I Fiskens Tegn which was published the same year. Wivels Forlag published the conservative literary and cultural magazine Heretica from 1948.  The publishing house closed in 1953 and most of the authors followed Wivel to Gyldendal the following year.

See also
 Gads Forlag

References

Publishing companies of Denmark
Mass media companies based in Copenhagen
Danish companies established in 1945